As of September 2016, the International Union for Conservation of Nature (IUCN) lists 2493 plant species categorized as Critically Endangered, including 145 which are tagged as possibly extinct or possibly extinct in the wild. 11% of all evaluated plant species are listed as critically endangered. 
The IUCN also lists 89 subspecies and 70 varieties as critically endangered.

Additionally 1674 plant species (7.6% of those evaluated) are listed as data deficient, meaning there is insufficient information for a full assessment of conservation status. As these species typically have small distributions and/or populations, they are intrinsically likely to be threatened, according to the IUCN. While the category of data deficient indicates that no assessment of extinction risk has been made for the taxa, the IUCN notes that it may be appropriate to give them "the same degree of attention as threatened taxa, at least until their status can be assessed."

This is a complete list of critically endangered plant species, subspecies and varieties evaluated by the IUCN. Species considered possibly extinct by the IUCN are marked as such.

Algae

Bryophytes
There are 23 bryophyte species assessed as critically endangered.

Mosses

Liverworts

Pteridophytes
There are 67 species and three varieties of pteridophyte assessed as critically endangered.

Leptosporangiate ferns
There are 54 species and three varieties in the class Polypodiopsida assessed as critically endangered.

Polypodiales
There are 49 species and three varieties in the order Polypodiales assessed as critically endangered.

Aspleniaceae

Dryopteridaceae

Species

Varieties

Polypodiaceae

Other Polypodiales species

Hymenophyllales

Salviniales
Marsilea fadeniana

Isoetopsida

Other pteridophyte species

Gymnosperms
There are 81 species, five subspecies, and 13 varieties of gymnosperm assessed as critically endangered.

Cycads

Species

Subspecies

Conifers

Species

Subspecies
Abies delavayi subsp. fansipanensis, Fansipan fir
Pinus torreyana subsp. torreyana 
Varieties

Dicotyledons
There are 1895 species, 78 subspecies, and 49 varieties of dicotyledon assessed as critically endangered.

Piperales

Piperaceae

Species

Varieties
Piper amalago var. variifolium

Campanulales
There are 62 species and 12 subspecies in Campanulales assessed as critically endangered.

Campanulaceae

Species

Subspecies

Goodeniaceae
Scaevola socotraensis

Aristolochiales

Theales
There are 295 species and 23 subspecies in Theales assessed as critically endangered.

Dipterocarpaceae

Species

Subspecies

Theaceae

Guttiferae

Other Theales species

Malvales

Species

Subspecies
Elaeocarpus submonoceras subsp. oliganthus
Hibiscus waimeae subsp. hannerae
Varieties
Bombax insigne var. polystemon

Geraniales

Lecythidales

Species

Subspecies
Eschweilera piresii subsp. viridipetala

Polygalales

Species

Subspecies
Byrsonima nemoralis subsp. dressleri

Santalales

Species

Varieties
Santalum insulare var. margaretae
Santalum insulare var. raivavense

Proteales

Species

Subspecies
Elaeagnus conferta subsp. dendroidea

Dipsacales

Plumbaginales

Rubiales

Species

Subspecies

Varieties
Chassalia coriacea var. johnstonii
Coprosma rapensis var. benefica, Red berry

Violales

Species

Subspecies
Cistus heterophyllus subsp. carthaginensis
Viola chamissoniana subsp. chamissoniana

Euphorbiales
There are 74 species, two subspecies, and ten varieties in Euphorbiales assessed as critically endangered.

Peraceae
Chaetocarpus pubescens

Buxaceae
Buxus vahlii, Vahl's boxwood

Euphorbiaceae

Species

Subspecies
Euphorbia cylindrifolia subsp. tuberifera
Euphorbia stenoclada subsp. ambatofinandranae
Varieties

Laurales
There are 40 species in the order Laurales assessed as critically endangered.

Monimiaceae

Hernandiaceae
Hernandia cubensis
Hernandia temarii

Lauraceae

Cucurbitales

Species

Subspecies
Begonia quadrialata subsp. dusenii

Ebenales
There are 45 species in Ebenales assessed as critically endangered.

Symplocaceae
Symplocos versicolor

Sapotaceae

Ebenaceae

Styracaceae
Styrax portoricensis

Celastrales
There are 29 species and two subspecies in the order Celastrales assessed as critically endangered.

Icacinaceae

Hollies

Species

Subspecies
Ilex perado subsp. iberica
Ilex perado subsp. lopezlilloi

Celastraceae

Dichapetalaceae
Dichapetalum korupinum
Dichapetalum letouzeyi

Myrtales
There are 97 species and five varieties in the order Myrtales assessed as critically endangered.

Myrtaceae

Species

Varieties
Eugenia harrisii var. grandifolia
Myrrhinium atropurpureum var. atropurpureum

Melastomataceae

Combretaceae

Species
Combretum tenuipetiolatum
Varieties

Thymelaeaceae

Water caltrops
Trapa colchica, Colchis water-chestnut

Lythraceae

Onagraceae
Epilobium numidicum

Sapindales
There are 70 species, three subspecies, and five varieties in the order Sapindales assessed as critically endangered.

Rutaceae

Species

Subspecies
Pilocarpus goudotianus subsp. heterochromus
Varieties
Zanthoxylum dipetalum var. tomentosum

Aceraceae

Species
Acer hainanense
Acer leipoense
Varieties
Acer buergerianum var. formosanum, Taiwan trident maple
Acer oblongum var. membranaceum

Sapindaceae

Species

Varieties
Alectryon macrococcus var. auwahiensis
Alectryon macrococcus var. macrococcus

Zygophyllaceae

Anacardiaceae

Meliaceae

Species

Subspecies
Trichilia trifolia subsp. pteleaefolia
Turraea mombassana subsp. schliebenii

Burseraceae
Canarium whitei
Commiphora wightii

Asterales

Species

Subspecies

Varieties

Magnoliales
There are 63 species and three subspecies in the order Magnoliales assessed as critically endangered.

Canellaceae
Pleodendron macranthum

Magnoliaceae

Species

Subspecies
Magnolia cubensis subsp. acunae
Magnolia virginiana subsp. oviedoae

Annonaceae

Species

Subspecies
Artabotrys modestus subsp. modestus

Myristicaceae

Capparales
There are 30 species and one variety in Capparales assessed as critically endangered.

Capparaceae

Cruciferae

Species

Varieties
Aethionema grandiflorum var. sintenisii, Persian stonecress

Apiales
There are 51 species and two varieties in the order Apiales assessed as critically endangered.

Araliaceae

Species

Varieties
Polyscias sechellarum var. contracta
Polyscias sechellarum var. curiosae

Umbelliferae

Gentianales
There are 41 species, two subspecies, and one variety in the order Gentianales assessed as critically endangered.

Apocynaceae

Loganiaceae

Species

Varieties
Labordia tinifolia var. wahiawaensis

Asclepiadaceae

Species

Subspecies
Ceropegia decidua subsp. pretoriensis
Pentarrhinum abyssinicum subsp. ijimense

Gentianaceae

Rosales
There are 48 species, two subspecies, and one variety in the order Rosales assessed as critically endangered.

Chrysobalanaceae

Rosaceae

Species

Subspecies
Alchemilla fischeri subsp. camerunensis
Polylepis tomentella subsp. nana

Other Rosales

Species

Varieties
Geissois ternata var. serrata

Primulales
There are 28 species and one variety in Primulales assessed as critically endangered.

Myrsinaceae

Theophrastaceae

Species
Clavija parvula
Varieties
Jacquinia macrantha var. clarendonensis

Primulaceae

Rhamnales

Species

Varieties
Cayratia pedata var. glabra

Urticales

Species

Varieties
Neraudia angulata var. angulata
Neraudia angulata var. dentata

Solanales

Species

Varieties
Ipomoea prismatosyphon var. trifida

Scrophulariales
There are 75 species, two subspecies, and one variety in the order Scrophulariales assessed as critically endangered.

Oleaceae

Gesneriaceae

Species

Subspecies
Saintpaulia ionantha subsp. grandifolia
Saintpaulia ionantha subsp. rupicola
Varieties
Gesneria scabra var. fawcettii

Bignoniaceae

Acanthaceae

Scrophulariaceae

Other Scrophulariales species

Lamiales
There are 64 species and three varieties in the order Lamiales assessed as critically endangered.

Verbenaceae

Labiatae

Species

Varieties

Boraginaceae

Nepenthales

Species

Subspecies
Sarracenia rubra subsp. alabamensis

Ranunculales

Species

Varieties
Cissampelos nigrescens var. cardiophylla

Polygonales

Podostemales

Fabales

Species

Subspecies
Astragalus macrocarpus subsp. lefkarensis, Lefkara milk-vetch
Varieties
Humboldtia unijuga var. trijuga

Caryophyllales
There are 145 species, two subspecies, and one variety in the order Caryophyllales assessed as critically endangered.

Caryophyllaceae

Species

Subspecies
Moehringia intricata subsp. tejedensis

Cactus

Species

Subspecies
Ariocarpus bravoanus subsp. bravoanus

Other Caryophyllales

Species

Varieties
Achyranthes splendens var. rotundata

Fagales

Species

Subspecies
Betula lenta subsp. uber, Virginia round-leaf birch
Betula procurva subsp. schugnanica

Other dicotyledons

Species

Varieties
Rhododendron protistum var. giganteum

Monocotyledons
There are 421 species, six subspecies, and five varieties of monocotyledon assessed as critically endangered.

Arecales

Species

Varieties

Orchidales
There are 167 species and one subspecies in Orchidales assessed as critically endangered.

Orchidaceae

Species

Subspecies
Cynorkis buchwaldiana subsp. buchwaldiana

Burmanniaceae

Pandanales

Bromeliales

Liliales

Species

Subspecies
Narcissus nevadensis subsp. enemeritoi

Arales

Araceae

Species

Subspecies
Arisaema heterocephalum subsp. okinawaense

Zingiberales

Eriocaulales

Commelinales

Cyperales
There are 37 species, two subspecies, and two varieties in Cyperales assessed as critically endangered.

Gramineae

Species

Subspecies
Puccinellia distans subsp. embergeri
Puccinellia distans subsp. font-queri
Varieties
Cenchrus agrimonioides var. agrimonioides

Cyperaceae

Species

Varieties
Cyperus pennatiformis var. bryanii

Other monocotyledons

Species

Subspecies
Najas marina subsp. arsenariensis

See also 
 Lists of IUCN Red List critically endangered species
 List of least concern plants
 List of near threatened plants
 List of vulnerable plants
 List of endangered plants
 List of recently extinct plants
 List of data deficient plants

References 

 
Plants
Critically endangered plants